Charles Rensselaer Ladd (April 9, 1822 – October 27, 1903) was an American attorney and politician who served as Massachusetts Auditor.

See also
 1869 Massachusetts legislature
 1870 Massachusetts legislature
 1873 Massachusetts legislature

References

Bibliography
 Andrews, George F.:, Official Gazette 1888 State House Directory, p. 13, (1888).
 Copeland, Alfred Minott: Our county and its people: A History of Hampden County Massachusetts, Volume One, pages. 149, 151  (1902).
 Hennessy, Michael Edmund: Twenty-Five Years of Massachusetts Politics: from Russell to McCall, 1890–1915, page 2, (1917).
 Rand, John Clark:, One of a Thousand: a Series of Biographical Sketches of One Thousand Representative Men, Boston, MA: First National Publishing Company, p. 362, (1890).
 The Atlanta Constitution, Charles R. Ladd., p. 9, (October 28, 1903).
 The New York Times, DEATH LIST OF A DAY. Charles Rensselaer Ladd, p. 9,  (October 28, 1903).

Footnotes

 

Politicians from Springfield, Massachusetts
People from Tolland, Connecticut
Massachusetts city council members
Republican Party members of the Massachusetts House of Representatives
Republican Party Massachusetts state senators
State auditors of Massachusetts
1822 births
1903 deaths
People from Chicopee, Massachusetts
19th-century American politicians